The Burntbush River is a tributary of the Turgeon River in Ontario, which flows into the Harricana River in Quebec; and the latest flows mainly in Quebec before crossing the Ontario border; then this river empties to the southern shore of James Bay in Ontario. The "Burntbush River" originated in Cochrane, Cochrane District, Northeastern Ontario, Canada.

Geography 

The hydrographic slopes adjacent to the Burntbush River are:
North side: Chabbie River (Ontario), Lawagamau River (Ontario), Detour River (Ontario and Quebec);
East side: Turgeon River (Ontario and Quebec);
South side: Mikwam River, Little Mikwam River, Porphyry Creek, Kabika River (Ontario), East Kabika River;
West side: Kesagami River, Wekweyaukastik River, little Wekweyaukastik River, North French River.

The Burntbush River originates at Upper Burntbush Lake. The upper part of the river is located south of Lawagamau Lake and east of Ontario Highway 652.

After another  segment, the Burntbush River receives the waters of the North Burntbush Lake discharge. Then the river continues towards  to the north shore of Burntbush Lake. The latter lake receives the waters of the landfill (from the south) of Soucie and East Soucie lakes. The current crosses Burntbush Lake on its full length,  to the southeast.

Toponymy 
The names Upper Burntbush Lake, North Burntbush Lake, Burntbush Lake and Burntbush River are of the same origin.

See also 

Cochrane District (Ontario)
Northeastern Ontario
North Burntbush River
Turgeon River, a watercourse
Harricana River, a watercourse
James Bay, a water body
Patten River, a watercouse
Kabika River (Ontario), a watercourse
List of rivers of Ontario

References

External links 

Burntbush